Ollerton Hall is a country house in the village of Ollerton, Cheshire, England.  Its nucleus dates from the 17th century, originally on an H-plan, followed by a succession of "rambling extensions".  A plaque over the entrance is inscribed with the initials THP" (for Thomas Henry Potts) and the date 1728.  The house was built originally for the De Baguley family.  The building is constructed in rendered brick with a slate roof.  It is in two storeys and, with the later extensions, has an E-plan. The entrance front has five bays, the central bay projecting forward with a gable.  At each end is a gabled cross wing.  The windows are a mixture of sashes and casements.  The house is recorded in the National Heritage List for England as a designated Grade II listed building.

See also

Listed buildings in Ollerton, Cheshire

References

Houses completed in 1728
Country houses in Cheshire
Grade II listed buildings in Cheshire
Grade II listed houses
1728 establishments in England